Petrosal may refer to:
 Inferior petrosal sinus
 Petrosal process
 Petrosal nerve (disambiguation)
 Petrous ganglion
 Petrous part of the temporal bone, in various animals referred to as the petrosal bone